The Garden of Jane Delawney is the debut album of British folk rock band Trees.

Track listing
All songs written by Bias Boshell except where noted.

 "Nothing Special" (Boshell, Unwin Brown, Barry Clarke, David Costa, Celia Humphris) – 4:31
 "The Great Silkie" (Traditional) – 5:15
 "The Garden of Jane Delawney" – 4:19
 "Lady Margaret" (Traditional) – 7:14
 "Glasgerion" (Traditional) – 5:18
 "She Moved Thro' the Fair" (Traditional) – 8:09
 "Road" – 4:36
 "Epitaph" – 3:26
 "Snail's Lament" – 4:40

Bonus Tracks

 "She Moved Thro' the Fair" (demo)
 "Pretty Polly" (demo)
 "Black Widow" (2008)
 "Little Black Cloud Suite" (2008)

Personnel
Trees
 Celia Humphris - vocals
 Barry Clarke - lead and acoustic guitars
 David Costa - acoustic and 12-string guitars, design, cover painting
 Bias Boshell - bass, vocals, acoustic guitar
 Unwin Brown - drums
Technical
Mike FitzHenry, Vic Gamm - engineer

Covers
Françoise Hardy covered "The Garden of Jane Delawney" on her album If You Listen.
All About Eve covered "The Garden of Jane Delawney" as a B-side to their single "What Kind of Fool" in 1988. They also did a similar interpretation of "She Moved Through the Fair".
Dark Sanctuary, a French goth/neo-classical band, also covered "The Garden of Jane Delawney" on their album Exaudi Vocem Meam - Part I, released in 2005.

References

1970 debut albums
CBS Records albums
Trees (folk band) albums